The City Airport Train (CAT) is an express airport rail link train that connects Vienna International Airport and Vienna city center (Wien Mitte railway station) in 16 minutes without intermediate stops.

Basic facts 

The City Air Terminal Betriebsgesellschaft m.b.H., owned 50.1% by Vienna Airport and 49.9% by Austrian Federal Railways, was founded in 2002 to operate the express train service.

Trains run between the airport and Wien Mitte train station daily every half hour from 05:37 am to 23:39 pm. For the approximately 20 kilometer route the CAT requires 16 minutes without intermediate stops. In the fiscal year 2019, 1.7 million passengers were transported, representing an increase of 3%, compared to 2018.

Departure stations 
At the airport as well as at Wien Mitte, the CAT departs from specially designated platforms. In Vienna the departure point, called City Air Terminal, is located on the ground floor of the shopping center Wien Mitte The Mall.

Services 
Passengers can check in their baggage at the City Air Terminal at the railway station Wien-Mitte and get their boarding passes. The City Air Terminal offers all the services of an international airport terminal with both staffed check-in desks and self-service check-in kiosks. This service is available from 24 hours until 75 minutes before departure. Airlines that offer check in include Austrian Airlines (except on flights to the United States, Canada and Asia), Brussels Airlines, Bulgaria Air, Croatia Airlines, Eurowings, Lufthansa, Luxair, People's, Swiss, TAP Air Portugal and Wizz Air.

The CAT offers particularly wide aisles, ample luggage space, free Wi-Fi, power outlets and TV screens on the train providing visitors with information about Vienna. A variety of newspapers and magazines as well as Epapers are available free of charge on the train and in the stations.

Tickets may already be booked on the Internet at www.cityairporttrain.com or at the CAT ticket machines at the City Air Terminal at Wien Mitte and the Vienna Airport.

The CAT BONUS CLUB is the membership scheme of the City Airport Train. Bonus Club members earn Bonus Points that can be redeemed for rewards. Membership is free.

For a short stay or stopover in Vienna, CAT offers special tickets as part of the CATch the City-offer. Packages include a CAT return ticket, a ticket for Viennese public transport (valid until midnight) and a sightseeing for the price of €39: http://stopover.cityairporttrain.com

Tickets 
Tickets can be bought at both destinations from the CAT staff and the ticket vending machines, on the train (with additional charges) or online in advance. A combined ticket can be purchased for onward travel in Vienna.

Ticket prices are €12 (single) and €21 (return) - online prices are €11 and €19. Children under the age of 15 travel for free. For comparison: the normal price with a regular ÖBB-train from the airport to Vienna is €4.30.

Competition 
The ÖBB Railjet trains also run every half hour and are slightly faster as well as cheaper. They run non-stop from Vienna Airport to Vienna's main railway station Wien Hauptbahnhof. ÖBB also operates suburban trains under the "Schnellbahn" brand to the airport as S7, calling at multiple stations downtown, including Wien Mitte. The ticket from/to Vienna city center by suburban or long-distance trains costs €4,30 one-way (compared to €11 for the City Airport Train, as of May 2022) or €8,60 return (€19 for the CAT). The journey on the S7 takes 23 minutes between the airport and Wien Mitte station.
The City Airport Train offered shorter travel times (16 minutes vs. 23 minutes on the S7), with similar service frequency (30-min intervals) as the suburban trains, thus having a competitive advantage. Since December 2014, long-distance trains (initially ICE, then Railjet services) also reach the airport, offering a competitive schedule to Wien Hauptbahnhof, with significantly cheaper tickets. ÖBB has further extended the suburban train services in 2017, introducing more limited stop "Regionalzug" services between Wien Mitte (and other downtown stations) and the airport, continuing to Wolfsthal. In the current timetable (2018), an average of 6 suburban and long-distance services connect downtown Vienna and the airport every hour, while the frequency of CAT departures remain constant (2 trains per hour).

Environment 
The CAT is powered by zero-emission traction current from 100% renewable energy (92% hydro, 8% wind power).

References

External links 
 
 

Airport rail links
Rapid transit in Austria
Transport in Vienna
S-Bahn in Austria
Railway services introduced in 2002